Santiago Medina (born in 1964) is a Colombian-American sculptor. His diverse career spans art, medicine, medical imaging (radiology), medical research, and education.

He is best known for his stainless steel sculptures – both outdoor monumental and indoor smaller works. He uses advanced medical imaging technology and software to design and create his sculpture, which have included commissions for institutions such as Harvard University School of Public Health, Washington University in St. Louis, Tufts University, Florida International University, CES University in Colombia, Miami Children's Hospital, St. Louis Catholic Church in Miami, Santa Maria de los Angeles Church (Colombia), Monasterio de la Santa Madre Laura (Colombia), and Ransom Everglades School in Miami.

Medina's works are in galleries and private collections throughout the world, and have been shown at major international exhibitions including Art Basel Week Red Dot Fair in Miami, Palm Beach International Art Fair, Arte America (Miami, US), Miami International Art Fair (MIA), Sincronia Feria de Arte (Bogota, Colombia), and the Biltmore Hotel in Coral Gables.

Sculpture and artistic work

Medina's earliest sculptures in the 1990s were in clay and over time began to also work in bronze and stainless steel. The pieces became larger in the 2000s and 2010s. In 2012, he worked with renowned urban architect Juan Felipe Uribe de Bedout on the Cedro Verde Project in Colombia. In 2014, "Life", a nine-foot monumental stainless steel sculpture was installed at the Harvard School of Public Health in Boston, Massachusetts to celebrate the first centennial of the school.

Mariavelia Savino, well known curator and gallerist, summarizes Medina's art as: "What is most unique about contemporary artist Santiago Medina is his aesthetic depth and erudition to capture, in stainless steel and bronze, the authentic expressiveness of the visual arts. His art displays energetic but yet enigmatic spiraling figures in continuous movement rising to the heavens. The topics covered joy and harmony, lovers and maternal love, life and friendship, ecstasy and passion, are the fabric of who we are as humans. All these strong emotions converge in his seductive art. Endowed with a solid training in the masters but with avant-garde inspiration, the work of Santiago Medina is clearly captivating and will transcend generations."

Early life

Medina was born and raised in Medellin, Colombia, to a family of artists and physicians. His great-grandfather Emiliano Mejia was a pioneer photographer and painter in Colombia in the late 1800s and early 1900s. His grandfather, Rafael Mejia Uribe, was also a painter and prominent pediatrician in Colombia. He was the first director of Clinica Noel in the 1920s, a pediatric charity hospital in Medellin. His father, Jorge Medina Gomez, was a physician and radiologist who graduated from Universidad de Antioquia School of Medicine at the head of his class. His mother, Susana, was a hospital volunteer at Medellin General Hospital

He attended the Dora Ramirez Art Institute in Medellin, Colombia since age 5. Dora Ramirez was a leading artist and renown teacher of her time who has paintings at the Museum of Antioquia. In the 1980s, he trained at Libe de Zulategui Atelier. De Zulategui a leading art teacher and critic in Colombia.

He studied at the Columbus School, a bilingual English-Spanish school, accredited both by the US and Colombian association of schools. He graduated at the head of his class and there he discovered his love for sports specially road cycling which is very popular in Colombia, country which breeds some of the top climbers in the world. In 1982, he start medical school at CES University with the idea of bringing medical sensibility to his strong artistic expression. He graduated first of his class and gave the graduation speech.

Physician

Inspired by the dual careers of Russian painter and lawyer Wassily Kandinsky and of his grandfather Rafael Mejia as a physician and artist he embarked on doing medicine and art as complementary careers. He decided to specialize in Radiology (Medical Imaging) because of its artistic 3D visual appeal and ground-breaking technology. He did his Diagnostic Radiology (Medical Imaging) residency at the Mallinckrodt Institute of Radiology, Washington University in St. Louis, US. He then subspecialized in Neuroradiology (Brain imaging) and Pediatric Radiology (Medical Imaging in Children) at Boston Children's Hospital a Harvard School of Medicine affiliated Hospital. Looking to bring a social meaning to his medical and artist work he enrolled in the Harvard School of Public Health to do a Master of Public Health with a concentration in Health Care Management. He then went ahead to become a leader in Evidence-based medicine in medical Imaging. He and co-editor Craig Blackmore, MD, MPH went on the publish in 2006, the first-ever book on Evidence-Based Imaging and subsequently with Kimberly Applegate, MD,MS a series on this topic including dedicated adult, pediatric and neuroimaging books. He has co-authored more than 50 peer review articles in major international medical journals including Pediatrics, Radiology, Neurology, American Journal of Neuroradiology and Pediatric Radiology.

While living in Boston he had the chance to see the monumental sculptures of Henry Moore at Harvard University ("Four Piece Reclining Figure") and Massachusetts Institute of Technology ("Three Piece Reclining Figure Draped"). As Medina studied these sculptures he realized the power of the monumental sculpture and the beauty of the abstract, a realization that gave a new direction to his future works.

Sculptor

Following his early training in rigorous academic artistic training with Ramirez and de Zulategui he enrolled in specialized courses at the Cincinnati Institute of Art and then at the University of Miami Night Art Program. After traveling in Italy in the 1990s to study Michelangelo and Leonardo da Vinci, he realized that in order to become a master sculptor he needed to have deeper training in drawing and oil painting. In 2003, he joins the Romero and Hidalgo Art Studios in Miami to work and study. Renowned Venezuelan master painters Abdon Romero and Sonia Hidalgo inspired him to master oil painting on linen in the tradition of the Renaissance masters (http://www.romerohidalgostudios.com/). Works from this 2000s included paintings from his blue period "Hope" and "Enlightment" currently at the College of Medicine Florida International University. Commissions for CES University Founders Library included "Imagine: A tribute to John Lennon" and "Da Vinci, the universal man". Religious commission included "Resurrection" for Saint Louis Catholic Church in Miami, US, "Jesus Savior" for Santa Maria de Los Angeles Church in Colombia and "A tribute to John Paul II" for Saint Madre Laura Convent in Colombia.

To further his studies in monumental sculpture he studies and works with American sculptor Nilda Comas at the Legacy Art Studio in Pietrasanta, Italy and Ft. Lauderdale, US. While studying in Pietrasanta and Carrara in Italy he decided to open large studios in Miami (Pinecrest), US and Medellin, Colombia devoted primarily to sculptures. Early bronze works are at the Washington University School of Becker Medical Library and Harvard School of Public Health François-Xavier Bagnoud building.

Medina explains the passion behind his sculptures as "I bring inert bronze and stainless steel to life by creating timeless masterpieces for art lovers." 
In 2013 during the Centennial of the Harvard School of Public Health, Medina started to work on a monumental sculpture to commemorate such an important event. The nine-foot-high monumental stainless steel sculpture "Life" was unveiled at Harvard in October 2014. Medina explains the motivation behind the sculpture: "I wanted to capture the essence of the Harvard School of Public Health which is the improvement of life. My inspiration was the double helical DNA molecule which is the code for all forms of life. Therefore, the sculpture has a double helical spiraling shape. Stainless steel with its very high quality finish was used not only because of its beauty and durability; but because it reflects life around it constantly changing its mood as the day, night and seasons come and go. In addition, the sculpture is actually alive by changing not only its look but also its temperature from the chili New England winters to the pleasant summer days."

In 2015, Medina is working on a monumental stainless steel sculpture for Miami Country Day School to celebrate its 75th anniversary.

Among his most important exhibitions during his career are 2006 Colombia Consulate in Miami, US; 2011 and 2014 Art Basel Week Red Dot Fair, 2013 and 2014 Palm Beach International Art Fair, Biltmore Hotel Coral Gables Solo Exhibitions (2010, 2011 and 2014), 2012 Arte America, 2013 Houston Art Fair, Miami International Art MIA Fair (2013, 2014), Sculpt Miami (2013,2014) and Sinfonia Art Fair Bogota (2014).

Honors

Republic of Colombia Department of State-Cancilleria de Colombia Special Award in the Arts.2019.
Key of the City Award. City of South Miami, US, 2019.
In 1980 was selected to paint a mural for the Piloto Public Library Medellin's (Colombia) most important public library.
In 1981 he became an honorary citizen of Huntsville, Alabama, US, for improving cultural and artistic relationships between the US and Colombia.
In 1999, the US Immigration and Naturalization Service granted Medina an Alien of Extraordinary Ability Immigrant Visa. Granted under very special circumstances to applicants who can prove outstanding artistic, scientific, athletic, community, or scholarly performance, this Visa affords the recipient and his family permanent residence status in the US.

About the sculptures

Medina's sculptures flow between organic and organo-geometric abstractionism. His sculptures balances masterfully the opposites of yin and yang in art. This gives them a lot of movement but at the same time elegance and minimalism.

All sculptures are made with the highest quality Italian stainless steel available and imported from the Milan, Italy area. They are hand made by directly welding piece by piece together of the Italian stainless steel plates into sculptures full of movement and light. The surface is finished with high quality mirror finish intertwined with fish scale and opaque highlights to accentuate the planes and depth of the sculpture. Some sculptures have a special tinted finish such as red and blue which allows to see the stainless steel full reflectivity but adds a beautiful color palette to the sculpture. Tinted is done with special baked aerospace paint. Other sculptures contrast rusted steel  or blue jean texture with stainless steel to accentuate the beauty of the opposites.

Many of the sculptures are free of a base allowing them to be totally free in time and space. They can be placed vertically or horizontally allowing to have multiple sculpture renditions in one. The collector becomes part of the artistic expression by selecting the position which fulfills more his or her artistic taste. Other sculptures have a pin mechanism which allows the collector to select their favorite angle. State-of –the-art LED lights can be added to take the sculpture into a whole new sculpture level by providing interesting color accents during the day or at night. The LED lights can be easily programmed to different setting which can have a power symbolic impact (i.e. Pink for Breast Cancer Awareness) or incorporate natures rhythmic cycles such as slow breathing or the waves washing on the beach in and out. The lights can be synchronized with music crescendos and decrescendos if so desired.The artist provides the artistic framework so the viewer and collector can be part of the artistic experience and, hence, take it to its fullest expression.

World wide sculptures and art

Harvard University Chen School of Public Health. Boston, US. Monumental Stainless Steel Sculpture "Life" commemorating the first Centennial of the School. 2014
Harvard University Chen School of Public Health. Boston, US. Permanent Bronze Sculpture "Maternal Love". 2011
Stanford University Children's Hospital. Permanent Stainless Steel Sculpture "Dreams". Palo Alto, California, US.
Ritz Carlton Hotel, Presidential Suite  "Pandora" Permanent Monumental Stainless Steel Sculpture. Mexico City, Mexico.
City of Miami Village of Pinecrest, US.  Permanent Monumental Stainless Steel Sculpture "Peace" at Circle of 72 Avenue and 98 Street. 2018
Historic Pinecrest Botanical Garden, Miami, US.  Permanent Monumental Stainless Steel Sculpture "Friendship". Miami 2017
Museum CES Medina. Permanent Monumental Sculpture at the Plaza of Nirvana. Sculpture and Plaza design, execution and concept by artist. Completed Spring 2018. Medellin, Colombia.
Boca Raton Hospital. Christine E. Lynn Women's Health & Wellness Institute. Florida Atlantic University. Permanent Monumental Stainless Steel Sculpture "Reflection". Boca Raton, Florida, US.
Historic Pinecrest Botanical Garden, Miami, US.  Permanent Monumental Stainless Steel Sculpture "Eternity". Miami 2020
Washington University School of Medicine Mallinckrodt Institute of Radiology. St. Louis, US.  Permanent Monumental Italian Stainless Steel and Rusted Steel. 2021.
Historic Biltmore Hotel, Monumental Sculpture "Life". Main Lobby. Coral Gables, US, 2014-2016
Washington University School of Medicine Becker Library. St. Louis, US.  Permanent Bronze Sculpture "Ecstasy". 2012.
Washington University School of Medicine Farrell Learning and Teaching Center. St. Louis, US.  Permanent Bronze Sculpture "Lovers". 2015.
Boston University. Monumental Stainless Steel Sculpture "Eternity". Expected opening Winter 2018. Boston, US. 2018
Tufts University Tisch Library. Greater Boston (Somerville), US. Permanent Stainless Steel Sculpture  "Infinity".
Miami  Nicklaus Children's Hospital. Permanente Monumental Stainless Steel Sculpture "Peace". Miami, US.
Florida International University College of Medicine. Miami, US. Permanent Bronze sculpture "Excellence" a tribute to the first graduating class of the physician from the FIU College of Medicine. 2012.
Florida International University College of Medicine. Miami, US. Permanent Monumental Sculpture Mirage. Sculpture and Plaza design, execution and concept by artist. 2018.
Miami Country Day School. Commissioned Monumental Stainless Steel Sculpture "Wisdom". Commemorating the exclusive 1937 Society. Plaza Colombia, Miami, US, 2015
Baptist Hospital South Beach, Miami US. Permanent Monumental Sculpture Blue Eternity. 2019.
The Parker Company. Headquarters. Stainless Steel Sculpture "Volare". Miami, US. 2013
The Parker Company. Headquarters. Permanent Monumental Stainless Steel Sculpture "Eternity". Miami, US. 2018
Belship Company Norway & Sweden. Monumental Stainless Steel Sculpture "Sigh". Sweden. 2015
Leonisa Internacional. Monumental Stainless Steel Sculpture "Liberty". Medellin, Colombia. 2012
Florida International University College of Medicine. Miami, US. Permanent Oil and Charcoal painting "Hope". 2011.
Florida International University College of Medicine. Miami, US. Permanent Oil and Charcoal painting "Enlightment". 2011.
Echo Aventura Luxury Condominiums.  Permanente Monumental Stainless Steel Sculpture "Peace". Project with renown architect Carlos Ott. Miami- Aventura, US.
Miami  Nicklaus Children's Hospital. Miami, US. Permanent Oil and Charcoal painting "Inner Strength" 2009.
Miami  Nicklaus Children's Hospital. Miami, US. Permanent Oil painting "Amistad" installed at the CEO Office of the Hospital. 2011.
Ramson Everglades School. Miami, US. Permanent Oil and Charcoal painting "Help". 2011.
Santa Maria de los Angels Church. Medellin, Colombia. Commissioned painting "Jesus Passion" 2008.
St. Louis Catholic Church. Miami, US. Commissioned painting "Resurrection" 2013.
St. Louis Catholic Church. Miami, US. Commissioned painting "Faith" 2014.
Monastery Saint Mother Laura. Commissioned oil painting "Saint Laura of Colombia" 2015.
Monastery Saint Mother Laura. Commissioned oil painting "Saint John Paul II" 2012.

Museum exhibitions and permanent collections

Coral Springs Museum of Art. Sculpture Blue Seduction incorporated into the Permanent Museum Collection in 2019. Coral Springs, US.
Nutibara Sculpture Museum Park. Monumental Stainless Steel Sculpture "Life" July to September 2013.
CES University Contemporary Art Museum. Stainless Steel Sculpture "Nirvana" incorporated Permanent Collection. Medellin, Colombia 2016.
CES University Contemporary Art Museum. Permanent Collection Oil and Charcoal painting "Leonardo da Vinci, the Universal Man". Medellin, Colombia. 2013.
CES University Contemporary Art Museum. Permanent Collection Oil painting "Imagine, a Tribute to John Lennon". Medellin, Colombia. Medellin, Colombia. 2013.
CES University Contemporary Art Museum. Solo Exhibition "Interactive Steel". Medellin, Colombia 2016.
Museo de la República Colombia. Sculpture Resilience. Given to President Ivan Duque from Colombia durante the dedication of the Colombian Sculpture Gardens at South Miami, US.

Large international solo exhibitions

Historical Pinecrest Gardens. Solo Monumental Stainless Steel Exhibition "Interactive Steel". October 2016-March 2017. Pinecrest. Miami. US.
CES University Contemporary Museum. Solo Stainless Steel  Sculpture Exhibition "Steel to the Infinite". April to May 2018. Pinecrest. Miami. US.
Historical Club Campestre. Solo Monumental Stainless Steel Exhibition "Interactive Steel". August 2016. Pinecrest. Medellin, Colombia.
Club Llanogrande. Solo Monumental Stainless Steel Exhibition "Interactive Steel". July 2016. Pinecrest. Medellin, Colombia.
Colombia Consulate in Miami, US. Solo Exhibition.
Solo Exhibitions at the Historical Biltmore Hotel in Coral Gables, US.

Exhibitions at art fairs around the world

Art Miami, Miami, US
New York Art Fair. New York, US
New York Art Fair-Context. New York, US
Art Context, Miami, US
Art Market San Francisco, US
Palm Springs Art Fair, California US
Houston Art Fair, Houston, US
ARTBO. International Art Fair of Bogota. Colombia
ARTMED. International Art Fair of Medellin. Colombia
Palm Beach Moderna + Contemporary Art Fair, Palm Beach, US
Hamptons Art Fair, Hamptons, NY, US
Palm Beach International Art Fair, Palm Beach, US
Wynwood Art Fair, Wynwood, Miami, US
SOFA Art Fair, Chicago, US
FORM Fair. Miami, US
Sculpt Miami, Miami, US
Arte America, Miami, US
Sinfonia, Bogota, Colombia
Miami International Art MIA Fair, Miami, US

References

External links

Living people
1964 births